"Petit Papa Noël" (literally Little Father Christmas) is a 1946 song recorded by French singer Tino Rossi. Written by Raymond Vincy (lyrics) and Henri Martinet (music), this Christmas song was originally performed by Rossi in Richard Pottier's film Destins. Since its initial recording, over 30 million copies have been sold worldwide. The song peaked at No. 6 on 28 December 1991 (the French SNEP Singles Chart was created on 4 November 1984), and was ranked every year under several labels, including Disques Pathé, Fifty Five and M6 Interactions (every label is charted separately). The song has been covered by many artists over the years.

Track listings
 Tino Rossi
 CD single – 1992 version
 "Petit Papa Noël" – 3:07
 "Minuit, chrétiens" – 3:11

 CD single – Disques Pathé
 "Petit Papa Noel" – 3:07
 "Vive le vent" – 2:30
 "Douce nuit" – 2:05
 "Noël des enfants oubliés" – 2:45

 CD single – Fifty Five
 "Petit Papa Noël"
 "Ave Maria"
 "Mon étoile"
 "Minuit Chrétien"

 Bébé Lilly
 CD single
 "Petit Papa Noël" – 3:26
 "Vive le vent d'hiver" – 2:00
 "Mon beau sapin, roi des forêts" – 2:09
 "Bonne année" – 3:28

 Pinocchio & Marilou
 CD single
 "Petit Papa Noël" – 3:59
 "Sous la neige étoilée" by Pinocchio – 4:16

Charts

See also
 List of Christmas carols

1 Original version
2 "Petit Papa Noël / Minuit, chrétiens"
3 Disques Pathé label
4 Fifty Five label
5 M6 Interactions label

References

Songs about Santa Claus
1946 songs
Tino Rossi songs
Bébé Lilly songs
Pinocchio (singer) songs
Josh Groban songs
Roch Voisine songs
French-language Christmas carols